Arkansas Repertory Theatre (The Rep) is the longest-running nonprofit resident theater in Arkansas. It is affiliated with Actors' Equity Association and offers a year-round season.  The Rep is housed in a 377-seat facility in Little Rock, Arkansas.  It was founded in 1976 by Cliff Fannin Baker.

The Rep's Executive Artistic Director is Will Trice. Until April 2018, the Producing Artistic Director was  John Miller-Stephany.  He succeeded longtime artistic director Robert Hupp in 2016,

The Rep produces six or seven productions annually. It attracts more than 70,000 patrons annually and offers performances over 200 nights each year. The Rep has mounted more than 350 productions, including 45 world premieres. A recent season included major stagings of The Crucible, Cheryl L. West's Jar The Floor and Sister Act.

On April 24, 2018, The Rep suspended production due to financial difficulties.  A volunteer committee led by longtime board member Ruth Shepherd was formed to raise $2.33 million. The Rep continued educational programming when production was suspended.

The Rep resumed performances on February 20, 2019.

Past Productions
2016-2017 Season
Monty Python's Spamalot
The Crucible
A Christmas Story
Sister Act
Jar the Floor
Godspell
2015-2016 Season
Macbeth
 The 25th Annual Putnam County Spelling Bee
 Disney's The Little Mermaid
 Peter and the Starcatcher
 The Bridges of Madison County
 Windfall
2014-2015 Season
 Memphis
 Wait Until Dark
 Elf
 The Whipping Man
 Mary Poppins
 August: Osage County
2013-2014 Season
 Pal Joey
 Red
 Because of Winn Dixie
 Clybourne Park
 Les Miserables
 The Compleat Wrks of Wllm Shkspr (Abridged)
2012-2013 Season
 Henry V
 Singin' on a Star
 White Christmas
 Gee's Bend
 Treasure Island~ A New Musical
 Death of a Salesman
 Avenue Q
2011-2012 Season
 Ring of Fire
 The Second City
 That 80s Show
 A Christmas Carol, The Musical
 To Kill a Mockingbird
 The Wiz
 Next to Normal
 A Loss of Roses

References

External links

Arkansas Repertory Theatre website
LORT website
Theatre Communications Group website
TheatreSquared website 
Arkansas Shakespeare Theatre website

Theatres in Arkansas
Theatre companies in Arkansas
Buildings and structures in Little Rock, Arkansas
Tourist attractions in Little Rock, Arkansas